Porter Sheldon (September 29, 1831 – August 15, 1908) was an American politician and a U.S. Representative from New York.

Early life
Born in Victor, New York, Sheldon completed preparatory studies, studied law, and was admitted to the bar in 1854 at Batavia, New York.

Career
Sheldon commenced practice in Randolph, New York, then moved to Rockford, Illinois, in 1857 and continued the practice of law. He served as member of the Illinois constitutional convention in 1861, then returned to Jamestown, New York, in 1865 and continued the practice of law.

Elected as a Republican to the Forty-first Congress, Sheldon was a United States Representative for the thirty-first district of New York from March 4, 1869 – March 3, 1871. An unsuccessful candidate for renomination in 1870, he resumed the practice of his profession. He was one of the founders of the American Aristotype Co. which later became part of the Eastman Kodak Company in Rochester.

Death
Sheldon died in Jamestown, New York, on August 15, 1908 (76 years, 10 months, and 17 days). He is interred in Lakeview Cemetery in Jamestown. His home, the Partridge-Sheldon House, was listed on the National Register of Historic Places in 2000.

Family life
Sheldon married Mary Crowley and they had a son, Ralph Crowley Sheldon.

References

External links

 

1831 births
1908 deaths
Republican Party members of the United States House of Representatives from New York (state)
19th-century American politicians
People from Victor, New York